Dadenggre is  town in west garo district and (PROPOSED DISTRICT) one of the 60 Legislative Assembly constituencies of Meghalaya state in India. It is part of West Garo Hills district and is reserved for candidates belonging to the Scheduled Tribes. It falls under Tura Lok Sabha constituency. Current MLA from this constituency is James Sangma of National People's Party.

Member of Legislative Assembly

Election results

2018

See also
List of constituencies of the Meghalaya Legislative Assembly
Tura (Lok Sabha constituency)
West Garo Hills district

References

Assembly constituencies of Meghalaya
West Garo Hills district